The Girellinae are a subfamily of fish in the sea chub family. They may be referred to as nibblers.

Species 
The species in two genera are:
 Genus Girella
 Girella albostriata (Steindachner, 1898)
 Girella cyanea (Macleay, 1881) - New Zealand bluefish, blue drummer
 Girella elevata (Macleay, 1881) - black drummer
 Girella feliciana (Clark, 1938)
 Girella fimbriata (McCulloch, 1920) - caramel drummer
 Girella freminvillii (Valenciennes, 1846)
 Girella laevifrons (Tschudi, 1846)
 Girella leonina (Richardson, 1846)
 Girella mezina (Jordan & Starks, 1907)
 Girella nebulosa (Kendall & Radcliffe, 1912) - Rapa Nui nibbler
 Girella nigricans (Ayres, 1860) - opaleye
 Girella punctata (Gray, 1835) - largescale blackfish	
 Girella simplicidens (Osburn & Nichols, 1916) - gulf opaleye
 Girella stuebeli (Troschel, 1866)
 Girella tephraeops (Richardson, 1846) - rock blackfish
 Girella tricuspidata (Quoy & Gaimard, 1824) - parore
 Girella zebra (Richardson, 1846) - zebra fish, stripey bream
 Girella zonata (Günther, 1859)
 Genus Graus
 Graus nigra (Philippi, 1887)

References

Kyphosidae